John "Jacky" Slicer (born 24 November 1902) was a professional footballer, who played for Huddersfield Town and Norwich City.

References

1902 births
Year of death missing
English footballers
People from Bramley, Leeds
Association football midfielders
English Football League players
Huddersfield Town A.F.C. players
Norwich City F.C. players
Sportspeople from Yorkshire